Philippe Vitel (born February 22, 1955 in Toulon) is a former member of the National Assembly of France. He represented Var's 2nd constituency,  before losing his seat in the 2017 legislative election. He is a member of The Republicans.

References

1955 births
Living people
Politicians from Toulon
Union for a Popular Movement politicians
The Popular Right
Deputies of the 12th National Assembly of the French Fifth Republic
Deputies of the 13th National Assembly of the French Fifth Republic
Deputies of the 14th National Assembly of the French Fifth Republic